Singed is a 1927 American silent drama film produced and distributed by Fox Film Corporation. The film was directed by John Griffith Wray and stars Blanche Sweet. Singed is based on Adela Rogers St. Johns's story "Love o' Women".

A print is preserved at the Museum of Modern Art in New York. With Czech intertitles.

Cast
Blanche Sweet as Dolly Wall
Warner Baxter as Royce Wingate
James Wang as Wong
Alfred Allen as Jim
Clark Comstock as Wes Adams
Howard Truesdale as Indian Agent
Claude King as Ben Grimes
Ida Darling as Mrs. Eleanor Cardigan
Mary McAllister as Amy Cardigan
Edwards Davis as Howard Halliday
Edgar Norton as Ernie Whitehead

See also
Blanche Sweet filmography

References

External links

 Lobby poster #1 (Wayback Machine)
Period advertisement lobby poster

1927 films
1927 drama films
Fox Film films
Silent American drama films
American silent feature films
Films based on short fiction
Films directed by John Griffith Wray
American black-and-white films
1920s American films